Euzophera formosella is a species of snout moth in the genus Euzophera. It was described by Rebel in 1910. It is found in Greece and Russia.

References

Moths described in 1910
Phycitini
Moths of Europe